Kankakee may refer to

Places
 Kankakee, Illinois
 Kankakee, Indiana
 Kankakee Community College
 Kankakee County, Illinois
 Kankakee River State Park
 Kankakee State Hospital
 Kankakee Valley High School

Geology
 Kankakee Arch
 Kankakee Outwash Plain
 Kankakee River
 Kankakee Torrent
 Lake Kankakee

Others
Kankakee, Beaverville and Southern Railroad
USCGC Kankakee, a Coast Guard cutter built in 1919 used on the Mississippi River.